North Mississauga Soccer Club is a Canadian semi-professional soccer club based in Mississauga, Ontario. The club was founded in 1982 as a youth soccer club and added its men's semi-professional club in League1 Ontario in 2016. The team plays home games at Paramount Fine Foods Centre, formerly known as the Hershey Centre. 

The club was one of the eight original founding women's teams in the League1 Ontario women's division, which was established in 2015.

History
The club's foundation dates back to 1974, when they were known as Streetsville Meadowvale Soccer Club.  They officially registered the club as a non-profit entity in 1982 and in 1995 changed the club's name to North Mississauga Soccer Club. In 2000, the club's U17 boys team, nicknamed the Panthers, won the U17 Ontario Cup and National Championship, and the club adopted the Panthers nickname for all its teams the following season to mark the achievement.

Originally a youth soccer club, the team added semi-professional teams in League1 Ontario in the men's and women's divisions in 2015 and 2016, respectively.

In 2015, the women's team won the first League1 Ontario League Cup.

The Mississauga-based League1 Ontario teams - Sigma FC and North Mississauga  (and formerly the now-Brampton-based ProStars FC) - compete annually for the Credit River Cup, awarded by the Sauga City Collective supporters group, with the team's matches against each other during the L1O deciding the victor.In 2019, the men won the inaugural title. A local Mississauga-based Toronto FC supporters group, Rogue Street Elite, has also become a supporters group for the club. 

In 2015, the club was surprised when they received financial solidarity compensation from West Ham United, as part of the transfer fee for former youth player Doneil Henry, who transferred to West Ham from Cypriot club Apollon Limassol.  In 2016, they later received another solidarity payment Liverpool for the transfer of Liam Millar from Fulham.

Seasons

Men

Women

Notable former players
The following players have either played at the professional or international level, either before or after playing for the League1 Ontario team:

Men

Women

References

Soccer clubs in Ontario
League1 Ontario teams
Sport in Mississauga
1982 establishments in Ontario
Association football clubs established in 1982